Constitution was a pre-Civil War community south of Atlanta. A prison was located there. Currently, Metro State Prison is located near the old abandoned prison. The city had a circular city limit and  half of it was in Fulton County and half of it was in DeKalb County. When Atlanta annexed the Thomasville area in 1952, it took up half of what was left of Constitution, which predated everything around it.

See also
 Ghost town
Cheevertown, Georgia
Dewsville, Georgia
Mimsville, Georgia

References

Geography of DeKalb County, Georgia
Ghost towns in Georgia (U.S. state)